The 1928 Harvard Crimson football team represented Harvard University as an independent during the 1928 college football season. In its third season under head coach Arnold Horween, Harvard compiled a 5–2–1 record and outscored opponents by a total of 125 to 29. Arthur E. French was the team captain. The team played its home games at Harvard Stadium in Boston.

Schedule

References

Harvard
Harvard Crimson football seasons
Harvard Crimson football
1920s in Boston